Valance Nambishi (born 30 November 1997) is a Zambian professional footballer who plays for FC Fredericia.

Career
Nambishi was born in Lusaka, Zambia, but is of Congolese background. He came with his mother to Denmark, an grew up in Hammel. He began playing football at Åstrup/Hammelev Fodbold before moving to the youth academy of Silkeborg IF.

On 15 January 2021 it was confirmed, that Nambishi would join FC Fredericia on 1 July 2021, when his contract with Silkeborg expired.

Honours
Silkeborg
 Danish 1st Division: 2019–20

References

Living people
1997 births
Sportspeople from Lusaka
Association football midfielders
Zambian footballers
Silkeborg IF players
FC Fredericia players
Danish Superliga players
Danish 1st Division players